Chungju Public Stadium is a sports complex and training ground in Chungju, South Korea. The stadium opened in 1979 and holds around 15,000 people. It is used mostly for football matches and athletics.  

It was the home of K League Challenge side Chungju Hummel FC between 2010 and 2016.

External links
 Chungju City Sports Facilities Management Office 
 Chungju Stadium 

Football venues in South Korea
Multi-purpose stadiums in South Korea
Sport in North Chungcheong Province
Buildings and structures in North Chungcheong Province
Chungju Hummel FC
Sports venues completed in 1979
K League 2 stadiums